Bucculatrix leptalea is a moth in the family Bucculatricidae. It was described by Annette Frances Braun in 1953. It is found in North America, where it has been recorded from Michigan, Manitoba, Washington and California.

The larvae feed on Artemisia dracunculus.

References

Natural History Museum Lepidoptera generic names catalog

Bucculatricidae
Moths described in 1963
Moths of North America
Taxa named by Annette Frances Braun